Quickening is a 2021 Canadian drama film, written and directed by Haya Waseem.

Waseem's debut full-length feature, the film stars Arooj Azeem as Sheila, a young Pakistani Canadian woman navigating her freedom from the social expectations of her immigrant family after starting university. When Sheila losses her virginity, then her boyfriend breaks up with her, followed by her father losing his job, the collective pressure causes her to suffer the physical and hormonal imbalances of a false pregnancy.

Arooj Azeem's parents, mother Bushra Azeem and father Ashir Azeem, play her character's parents in the film, while Quinn Underwood plays the boyfriend, Eden.

The film premiered in the Discovery program at the 2021 Toronto International Film Festival (TIFF),
with Arooj Azeem being named among TIFF's Share Her Journey Rising Stars Fellows for emerging actors.

References

External links

2021 films
2021 drama films
Canadian drama films
Films about Asian Canadians
2020s Canadian films